M. C. Sampath is an Indian politician and former member of the Tamil Nadu legislative assembly from Cuddalore constituency. He is former the Minister for Industrial Department, Govt. of Tamil Nadu. He represents Anna Dravida Munnetra Kazhagam party.

Sampath was Minister for Special Program Implementation until November 2011 when a cabinet reshuffle by Jayalalithaa resulted in him becoming Minister for Rural Industries, where he replaced C. Shanmugavelu.

Electoral performance

References 

All India Anna Dravida Munnetra Kazhagam politicians
Living people
State cabinet ministers of Tamil Nadu
Year of birth missing (living people)
Tamil Nadu MLAs 2001–2006
Tamil Nadu MLAs 2006–2011
Tamil Nadu MLAs 2016–2021